The metropolitan cities of Italy are administrative divisions of Italy, operative since 2015, which are a special type of sub-provinces. The metropolitan city, as defined by law, includes a large core city and the smaller surrounding towns that are closely related to it with regard to economic activities and essential public services, as well as to cultural relations and to territorial features.

History
In 2009, amendments added Reggio Calabria to the list. The metropolitan areas defined by the autonomous regions were: Cagliari and Sassari in Sardinia; Catania, Messina and Palermo in Sicily.

On 3 April 2014 the Italian Parliament approved a law that established ten metropolitan cities in Italy, excluding the autonomous regions. Five more were added later. The new metropolitan cities (except Sassari, which ceased to exist in 2016 after being merged with the province of Olbia-Tempio to form the province of Sassari) have been operative since 1 January 2015.

Government
A metropolitan city is composed of a central city, which serves as the seat of government, and its surrounding municipalities. Each metropolitan city is headed by a metropolitan mayor, who is assisted by a legislative body, the metropolitan council, and by a non-legislative assembly, the metropolitan conference.

The metropolitan mayor is the chief executive and administrative officer of the city. The mayor represents, convenes and chairs meetings of the metropolitan council, administers city offices, supervises the functioning of city services, and prepares the city's budget.  The mayor of the provincial capital comune automatically becomes the metropolitan mayor.

The metropolitan council is the chief legislative body of the metropolitan city.  It proposes laws and amendments to the metropolitan conference, and approves programs, regulations and rules submitted to it by the metropolitan mayor such as the budget.  The council consists of mayors and city councillors of each commune in the metropolitan city elected from amongst themselves using partially open list proportional representation, with seats allocated using the D'Hondt method.  Metropolitan councillors are elected at-large for five-year terms; votes for metropolitan councillors are weighted by grouping comunes of a certain population range into nine groups so that votes of the mayors and city councillors of the more populous groups are worth than those of less populous groups.  The number of councillors a metropolitan city is granted depends upon its population: metropolitan cities with a population of 3 million or more have 24 councillors; metropolitan cities with a population of 800,000 but less than or equal to 3 million have 18 councillors; all other metropolitan cities have 14 councillors.

The metropolitan conference adopts or rejects laws and amendments approved by the metropolitan council. It is the ultimate approving body of the city's budget.  Actions in the conference require votes of at least two-thirds of comunes in the metropolitan city and the majority of overall resident population. The conference is composed of all mayors of the communes within the metropolitan city.

Functions
Metropolitan cities carry out the basic functions of a province.  However, particular functions that devolved to them include but are not limited to: 
 local planning and zoning;
 provision of local police services;
 transport and city services coordination.

Metropolitan cities

See also

Regions of Italy
Provinces of Italy
List of cities in Italy
Municipalities of Italy

References

External links

 
Subdivisions of Italy
Administrative divisions in Europe